Julia Trashlieva (Bulgarian: Юлия Трашлиева; born 3 February 1936) is a retired Bulgarian rhythmic gymnast. She is the 1963 World All-around bronze medalist and member of the Bulgarian group that won bronze in the first ever Group competition held in 1967 World Championships in Copenhagen. She is the first Bulgarian to win a medal at the World Championships.

Career 
Julia Trashlieva competed in both Artistic and Rhythmic gymnastics. In Artistic she won the national title 6 times and in Rhythmic she won 8 National titles.

She is part of the first Bulgarian national team of rhythmic gymnastics, with which she won two bronze medals at the first World Championship in Budapest in 1963. 28 gymnasts from 10 nations took part in a competition called the First European Cup Tournament, in the Palace of Sports, Budapest, Hungary, on Saturday 7 December 1963. They were from Belgium, Bulgaria, German Democratic Republic, Spain, Poland, USSR, Hungary, Finland and Czechoslovakia. In Rome, Italy in 1964 FIG recognized this competition as the 1st World RSG Championships.

Trashlieva had a definite contribution to the development of RG sport in Bulgaria as coach of the national group and coach in the metropolitan sport society “Spartak”. She led the Bulgarian Group at the first World championship for Group competition held in Copenhagen in 1967.

References

External links

1936 births
Bulgarian rhythmic gymnasts
Gymnasts from Sofia
Living people
Medalists at the Rhythmic Gymnastics World Championships